Broken Toy or variants may refer to:

Film and TV
The Broken Toy, 1915 short with Violet Mersereau
Broken Toys (1935 film),  1935 Disney animation short by Ben Sharpsteen
Toote Khilone (Broken Toys), 1954 Indian film directed by Nanabhai Bhatt
Juguetes rotos (Broken Toys), 1966 Spanish film by Manuel Summers

Music
Broken Toys!, Orpheum Theatre (Manhattan) 1981
Broken Toy Records Samantha Ronson
The Broken Toys (band), David Virgin
Broken Toys Studios, Brisbane, where Powderfinger (EP) was recorded
Broken Toys, album by Smoove & Turrell 2014
"Broken Toy", album track by Keane
"Broken Toy", song by Floater from Wake
"Broken Toy", song by SNFU from ...And No One Else Wanted to Play
"Broken Toy", song by Azalia Snail from Soft Bloom 1999
"Broken Toy", song by The First Class 1980
"Broken Toys", Korean song by Epik High from Remapping the Human Soul 2007.